Lake Roosevelt National Recreation Area is a U.S. national recreation area that encompasses the  long Franklin D. Roosevelt Lake between Grand Coulee Dam and Northport, Washington, in eastern Washington state. The Grand Coulee Dam was built on the Columbia River in 1941 as part of the Columbia River Basin project. Lake Roosevelt National Recreation Area is a unit of the National Park Service and provides opportunities for fishing, swimming, canoeing, boating, hunting, camping, and visiting historic Fort Spokane and St. Paul's Mission. Crescent Bay Lake in Grant County just southwest of Lake Roosevelt also falls under the jurisdiction of the National Recreation Area.

It was established in 1946 as the Coulee Dam Recreational Area and was created by a memorandum of agreement with the Spokane Tribe, Colville Indian Reservation, and United States Bureau of Reclamation. It has, uniquely with Curecanti National Recreation Area, never been established by Congress or the president. The recreation area was renamed for President Franklin D. Roosevelt in 1996, over objections from the Colville Tribe.

History

St. Paul's Mission was a Jesuit mission church established in the Hudson's Bay Company (HBC) in the 1830s. The mission was built near the HBC's Fort Colville, on the bluff then overlooking Kettle Falls on the Columbia River.
Fort Spokane was a U.S. Army frontier outpost in Lincoln County, Washington. Located at the confluence of the Columbia and Spokane rivers, it separated the Colville and Spokane tribes from Spokane. The fort was closed in 1929.
Confederated Tribes of the Colville Reservation is in north central Washington

Spokane Tribe of Indians is in northeastern Washington, centered at Wellpinit. The reservation is located almost entirely in Stevens County, but also includes two small parcels of land (totaling about ) in Lincoln County, including part of the Spokane River.

Things to Do
Boating, Canoe & Kayak – 22 public boat launches, plus 4 available to non-members on the Colville Reservation, by permit.
Camping – 3 Standard campgrounds, 9 Boat-in campgrounds
Fishing
Swimming

References

External links 

 Lake Roosevelt NRA
 
Park foundation document
 Visitation statistics

National Park Service National Recreation Areas
National Park Service areas in Washington (state)
Protected areas of Ferry County, Washington
Protected areas of Grant County, Washington
Protected areas of Lincoln County, Washington
Protected areas of Stevens County, Washington
Parks in Washington (state)
National parks in Washington (state)
Canoeing and kayaking venues in the United States
1946 establishments in Washington (state)
Protected areas established in 1946